Trigonodera is a genus of wedge-shaped beetles in the family Ripiphoridae. There are at least three described species in Trigonodera.

Species
These three species belong to the genus Trigonodera:
 Trigonodera nubila Gerstaecker, 1855
 Trigonodera schaefferi Rivnay, 1929
 Trigonodera tokejii (Nomura & Nakane, 1959)

References

Further reading

 
 

Ripiphoridae
Articles created by Qbugbot